Qarah Hajji-ye Olya (also Romanized as Qarah Ḩājjī-ye ‘Olyā; also known as Qarah Ḩājjīlū-ye Bālā and Qarah Ḩājjīlū-ye ‘Olyā) is a village in Kandovan Rural District, Kandovan District, Meyaneh County, East Azerbaijan Province, Iran. At the 2006 census, its population was 60, in 10 families.

References 

Populated places in Meyaneh County